Maroine Mihoubi (born 26 July 1999), is a French footballer of Tunisian descent, who currently plays as a centre-back.

Career statistics

Club

Notes

References

1999 births
Living people
French footballers
French expatriate footballers
Tunisian footballers
Association football defenders
AS Monaco FC players
Nîmes Olympique players
Stade Tunisien players
Aubagne FC players
FC Lviv players
Jammerbugt FC players
Championnat National 3 players
Tunisian Ligue Professionnelle 1 players
Ukrainian Premier League players
Danish 1st Division players
French expatriate sportspeople in Ukraine
French expatriate sportspeople in Denmark
Expatriate footballers in Ukraine
Expatriate men's footballers in Denmark